"I Don't Feel Like Dancin'" is a song by American pop band Scissor Sisters. It was released in August 2006 as the first single from their second album, Ta-Dah (2006). The song was written by Jason Sellards, Scott Hoffman and Elton John, the last of whom provides piano for the song, and was the band's first top-10 single in many countries. The song gave the band their only number one in the United Kingdom to date and is one of their signature tracks.

Content
The song's tempo, arrangement, use of falsetto vocals, and subject matter have been compared by reviewers in The Guardian and The Sun to Leo Sayer's 1976 hit "You Make Me Feel Like Dancing". The song also features a rhythm piano that makes reference to "December, 1963 (Oh, What a Night)" by The Four Seasons.

Music video
The video, a cinematographic melange, is staged as an animated bill poster for the band, located outside Phoenix Cinema in North London. As a young boy (Chester McKee, a contestant on I'd Do Anything) gazes into the poster, the camera zooms in and the poster fills the frame, suddenly animating into complex motion and dramatic scenes, before pulling out and the image returning to a still bill poster at the end.

The video was created using a combination of digital compositing techniques including stop/start technology and background/foreground illusions and was directed by Andy Soup with Independent Films, with producer Verity White and director of photography Alex Barber. Post production was by flame artist Ben Robards at Absolute Post, and editor Amanda James at Final.

Track listings

UK CD1 and European CD single 
 "I Don't Feel Like Dancin'" – 4:48
 "Ambition" – 4:39

UK CD2 
 "I Don't Feel Like Dancin'" – 4:48
 "I Don't Feel Like Dancin'" (Linus Loves dub) – 5:54
 "I Don't Feel Like Dancin'" (video)

UK 8-inch square picture disc and Japanese CD single 
 "I Don't Feel Like Dancin'" – 4:48
 "I Don't Feel Like Dancin'" (Linus Loves vocal edit) – 4:02

Australian CD single 
 "I Don't Feel Like Dancin'" (album version) – 4:48
 "Ambition" – 4:39
 "I Don't Feel Like Dancin'" (Linus Loves vocal edit) – 4:02
 "I Don't Feel Like Dancin'" (video)

Charts

Weekly charts

Year-end charts

Decade end charts

Certifications

Release history

References

External links
 Underground Illusion - The Ultimate Scissor Sisters Database
 

2006 singles
2006 songs
European Hot 100 Singles number-one singles
Number-one singles in Australia
Number-one singles in Austria
Number-one singles in Germany
Number-one singles in Norway
Number-one singles in Sweden
Number-one singles in Scotland
Polydor Records singles
Scissor Sisters songs
Songs about dancing
Songs with music by Elton John
Songs written by Babydaddy
Songs written by Jake Shears
UK Singles Chart number-one singles
Universal Motown Records singles